Together, released by Motown in 1969 (catalog number MS 692), was the second and final duets studio album combining Diana Ross & the Supremes and The Temptations into an eight-person Motown act. Like the first duets LP, Diana Ross & the Supremes Join The Temptations, it is composed almost entirely of covers, including versions of The Band's "The Weight", Sly & the Family Stone's "Sing a Simple Song", Frankie Valli's "Can't Take My Eyes Off You" (featuring Mary Wilson leading, in preparation for Ross' departure from the Supremes) and Motown songs like "Ain't Nothing Like the Real Thing" and "Uptight (Everything's Alright)". "The Weight" was the only single in the US, and failed to make it into the American Top 40. "Why (Must We Fall in Love)", a UK exclusive single, was a Top 40 hit on the UK singles charts.

Together was released on the same day (September 23, 1969) as Puzzle People, a regular Temptations album showcasing the group's then-current psychedelic soul sound.

Track listing

Personnel
Diana Ross – vocals
Mary Wilson – vocals
Cindy Birdsong – vocals
Dennis Edwards – vocals
Eddie Kendricks – vocals
Paul Williams – vocals
Melvin Franklin – vocals
Otis Williams – vocals
The Andantes – additional background vocals
Frank Wilson – producer, executive producer
Smokey Robinson – producer
Al Clevland – producer
Terry Johnson – producer
Tom Baird – producer/arranger
Various Los Angeles area session musicians – instrumentation

Charts

References

1969 albums
The Supremes albums
The Temptations albums
Collaborative albums
Covers albums
Motown albums
Albums produced by Smokey Robinson
Albums produced by Frank Wilson (musician)
Albums produced by Henry Cosby
Albums produced by Al Cleveland
Albums produced by Deke Richards